Åstorps FF is a Swedish football club located in Åstorp in Skåne County.

Background
Åstorps Fotbollförening were formed on 2 December 1996 following the merger of the Åstorps Idrottsförening and Nyvångs Gymnastik and Idrottsförening clubs. Both these clubs had long histories, Åstorps IF being founded in 1913 and Nyvångs GIF in 1922. The club colours of Åstorps FF are white-blue-blue.

Since their foundation Åstorps FF has participated mainly in the middle and lower divisions of the Swedish football league system.  The club currently plays in Division 4 Nordvästra Skåne which is the sixth tier of Swedish football. They play their home matches at the Bjärshögs IP in Åstorp.

Åstorps FF are affiliated to Skånes Fotbollförbund.

Recent history
In recent seasons Åstorps FF have competed in the following divisions:

2018 – Division IV, Skåne Nordvästra
2017 – Division IV, Skåne Nordvästra
2016 – Division V, Skåne Nordvästra
2015 – Division V, Skåne Nordvästra
2014 – Division V, Skåne Nordvästra
2013 – Division IV, Skåne Nordvästra
2012 – Division IV, Skåne Västra
2011 – Division III, Sydvästra Götaland
2010 – Division IV, Skåne Nordvästra
2009 – Division III, Sydvästra Götaland
2008 – Division III, Sydvästra Götaland
2007 – Division III, Sydvästra Götaland
2006 – Division III, Sydvästra Götaland
2005 – Division IV, Skåne Västra
2004 – Division V, Skåne Nordvästra A
2003 – Division V, Skåne Nordvästra A
2002 – Division V, Skåne Nordvästra
2001 – Division V, Skåne Nordvästra
2000 – Division IV, Skåne Norra
1999 – Division V, Skåne Nordvästra

Attendances

In recent seasons Åstorps FF have had the following average attendances:

Footnotes

External links
 Åstorps FF – Official website

Sport in Skåne County
Football clubs in Skåne County
Association football clubs established in 1996
1996 establishments in Sweden